Likhoslavl is a town and the administrative center of Likhoslavlsky District in Tver Oblast, Russia, located on the Moscow–St. Petersburg Railway,  northwest of Tver, the administrative center of the oblast. Population:

History
Likhoslavl developed on the spot where localities of Ostashkovo (founded in 1624) and Likhoslavl (first mentioned in the early 19th century) once stood. Likhoslavl grew up as a settlement serving the railway station. It was a part of Novotorzhsky Uyezd of Tver Governorate. It was granted town status in 1925.

On July 12, 1929, the governorates and uyezds were abolished. Likhoslavlsky District, with the administrative center in Likhoslavl, was established within Tver Okrug of Moscow Oblast. On July 23, 1930, the okrugs were abolished and the districts were directly subordinated to the oblast. On January 29, 1935, Likhoslavlsky District was transferred to newly established Kalinin Oblast. On July 9, 1937, Likhoslavlsky District was included into Karelian National Okrug, which was established as a Tver Karelians autonomy, and became its administrative center. On February 7, 1939, the okrug was abolished. In February 1, 1963, during the abortive administrative reform by Nikita Khrushchev, Likhoslavlsky District was merged into Torzhoksky District, but on March 4, 1964 it was re-established. In 1990, Kalinin Oblast was renamed Tver Oblast.

Administrative and municipal status
Within the framework of administrative divisions, Likhoslavl serves as the administrative center of Likhoslavlsky District. As an administrative division, it is, together with three rural localities, incorporated within Likhoslavlsky District as Likhoslavl Urban Settlement. As a municipal division, this administrative unit also has urban settlement status and is a part of Likhoslavlsky Municipal District.

Economy

Industry
There are enterprises of electrotechnical, ceramic, and food industries in Likhoslavl.

Transportation

Likhoslavl has a railway station on the railway connecting Moscow and St. Petersburg. Another railway branches west and heads to Torzhok and further to Ostashkov and Rzhev.

The town is connected by road with Torzhok, where it has access to the M10 Highway connecting Moscow and St. Petersburg. Likhoslavl is also connected by road with Mednoye, where it has another access to M10.

Culture and recreation

Likhoslavl contains seven objects classified as cultural and historical heritage of local significance. All of these are related to the events of World War II, and even though the town was not occupied by German forces, Likhoslavsky District was close to the front line.

Likhoslavlsky District is one of four districts of Tver Oblast with a significant number of Tver Karelians. In Likhoslavl, there is a local museum mostly devoted to Tver Karelian culture and ethnography.

Notable people
Actress Olesya Rulin is from Likhoslavl.

References

Notes

Sources

"XLIII. Тверская губернія. Списокъ населенныхъ мѣстъ по свѣдѣнiямъ 1859 года" (XLIII. Tver Governorate. List of Populated Places per the 1859 Data). Подъ ред. И. Вильсона (Ed. I. Vilson). Санктпетербургъ, 1862 (St. Petersburg, 1862).

Cities and towns in Tver Oblast
Populated places established in 1624
Novotorzhsky Uyezd
1624 establishments in Russia